Santiago David Távara (born April 17, 1965 in Ventanilla, Callao, Perú) is an experienced Peruvian-born journalist and author living in the Washington, D.C., area. For more than two decades Mr. Távara has covered local news stories in the Washington, D.C., area as well as cultural, sports, economy, social, national, and international issues.

He has specialized in topics which affect the Hispanic community such as immigration, business, health, and demographics. He has also been assigned to cover national and international issues in the White House, the U.S. Congress, the State Department, the Organization of American States, the IMF, and the World Bank.

Journalistic career

Washington Post

Távara began his journalism career in the United States in 2000 when he served as a reporter for the Washington Post newspaper in Washington, D.C.

Notimex

In 2003 Távara was hired by Notimex, the official Mexican news agency, to cover national and international issues in the White House, the U.S. Congress.

Metro Latino

Took the position as an Editor/Reporter at Medio Latino, specialized in the Hispanic community source: immigration, business, health, and demographics

CIP Americas Program

Collaborator with Center for International Policy Americas Program

Career timeline
2000–2003 Reporter Washington Post in Washington DC
2003–2013 Correspondent Notimex in Washington DC
2013–2015 Editor/Reporter at Metro Latino http://metrolatinousa.com in Washington DC
2015– Now Editor at Metro Latino http://metrolatinousa.com in Washington DC

Author

Mr Tavara is the author of the book: Obama, el duro no se pudo

References

1965 births
Peruvian male writers
Living people
Peruvian journalists
Male journalists
Peruvian emigrants to the United States